"Weekend"  is a song recorded by South Korean singer Taeyeon. It was released digitally on July 6, 2021, by SM Entertainment. The song is written by Hwang Yu-bin and composed by RoseInPeace, Saimon, Willemijn van der Neut, Marcia "Misha" Sondeijker. Initially a standalone single, the song was later included on Taeyeon's third studio album, INVU, released on February 14, 2022.

Background and release
On June 29, 2021, it was announced that Taeyeon will be releasing a digital single titled "Weekend". On July 3, a portion of the music video was leaked on KBS's Mr. House Husband 2 before the release of the music video teaser. On July 4, the music video teaser was released. On July 6, the song together with the music video was released.

Composition

"Weekend" is composed by Hwang Yu-bin, RoseInPeace, Saimon, Willemijn van der Neut, and Marcia "Misha" Sondeijker. Musically, the song is described as a disco and city pop song characterized by guitar and retro synth sounds with lyrics about "wanting to freely go on a trip during the weekend". "Weekend" was composed in the key of A-flat major, with a tempo of 114 beats per minute.

Commercial performance

"Weekend" debuted at number ten on South Korea's Gaon Digital Chart in the chart issue dated July 4–10, 2021; on its component charts, the song debuted at number two on the Gaon Download Chart, and number 21 on the Gaon Streaming Chart. It ascended to number four on the Gaon Digital Chart in the following week, and number five on the Gaon Streaming Chart in the chart issue dated August 8–14, 2021. The song also spent 15 consecutive weeks in the Top 10 on the Gaon Digital Chart.

The song debuted at number seven and number 58 on Billboard World Digital Songs and K-pop Hot 100, respectively, in the chart issue dated July 17, 2021. The song ascended to number four on the Billboard K-pop Hot 100 in the chart issue dated September 18, 2021. The song debuted at number 16 on the Billboard South Korea Songs in the chart issue dated May 7, 2022. In Singapore, the song debuted at number seven on the RIAS Regional Chart in the chart issue dated July 9–15, 2021. Globally, the song debuted at number 181 on Billboard Global Excl. U.S. in the chart issue dated on July 24, 2021.

Promotion
Prior to the song's release, on July 6, 2021, Taeyeon held a live event called "Weekend: Taeyeon Entertainment's 1st Half of the Year Meeting'" on V Live to introduce the song and communicate with her fans. Following the release of the single, she performed "Weekend" on four music programs: Mnet's M Countdown on July 8, KBS2's Music Bank on July 9, MBC's Show! Music Core on July 10, and SBS's Inkigayo on July 11.

Credits and personnel
Credits adapted from liner notes of INVU.

Studio
 MonoTree Studio – recording
 SM Yellow Tail Studio – recording, digital editing
 SM LVYIN Studio – digital editing
 SM SSAM Studio –  digital editing, engineered for mix
 SM Blue Cup Studio – mixing

Personnel

 SM Entertainment – executive producer
 Lee Soo-man – producer
 Yoo Young-jin – Music and sound director
 Taeyeon – vocals, background vocals
 Kwon Ae-jin – background vocals
 Willemijn van der Neut – background vocals, composition
 Hwang Yu-bin – lyrics
 RoseInPeace – composition, arrangement
 Saimon – composition, arrangement
 Marcia "Misha" Sondeijker – composition
 Kang Sun-young – recording
 Noh Min-ji – recording, digital editing
 Kang Eun-ji – digital editing, engineered for mix
 G-high – vocal directing, Pro Tools
 Jeong Jeong-seok – mixing
 Lee Sang-hyun – drums, bass
 Lee Seol-min – guitar, keyboard

Charts

Weekly charts

Monthly charts

Year-end charts

Certifications

! colspan="3" | Streaming
|-

Accolades

Awards and nominations

Listicles

Release history

See also
 List of certified songs in South Korea

References

2021 songs
2021 singles
SM Entertainment singles
Korean-language songs
Taeyeon songs
Disco songs
Synth-pop songs
Pop-rap songs
Bubblegum pop songs